The 1961–62 SM-sarja season was the 31st season of the SM-sarja, the top level of ice hockey in Finland. 10 teams participated in the league, and Ilves Tampere won the championship.

Regular season

8th place
 SaiPa Lauritsala - TPS Turku 6:2

External links
 Season on hockeyarchives.info

Fin
Liiga seasons
1961–62 in Finnish ice hockey